The  (“Leaders Reserve” or "Reserve for Leaders") was set up in the German Armed Forces during World War II in 1939 as a pool of temporarily unoccupied high-ranking military officers awaiting new assignments. The various military branches and army groups each had their own pools that they could use as they saw fit. The officers were required to remain at their assigned stations and be available to their superiors but could not exercise any command function, which was in effect equivalent to a temporary retirement while retaining their previous active income.

Etymology
The name does not allude to Adolf Hitler. The first compound, refers in plural to the members themselves as an officer (the leaders) reserve.  in this case is not used possessively to indicate that this was Hitler’s reserve.

References

Wehrmacht
1939 establishments in Germany